Michele Gallaccio (born 3 March 1986 in Italy) is an Italian retired footballer.

Career

At the age of 16, Gallaccio signed for Chelsea, one of the most successful teams in England, from the S.S. Lazio youth academy, where he earned 10000 pounds a month.

In 2005, Gallaccio joined A.C. Pisa 1909 in the Italian third division because he thought he would never get a chance to play with Chelsea. However, he only made one league appearance with the club.

By 2009, Gallaccio was playing in the Italian fifth division with U.S. Palestrina 1919.

References

External links
 

Italian footballers
Living people
Association football forwards
1986 births
Pisa S.C. players
Benevento Calcio players